is an ero guro tankōbon manga released in Japan consisting of 11 chapters and an omake, written and illustrated by Waita Uziga. It was published by Sanwa Shuppan on April 21, 2004, and serialized in Ayla Deluxe magazine. The manga was adapted from a previous ero guro manga written and illustrated by Waita Uziga, called Game Over, which is a compilation of 10 short stories. Two of the chapters were about Mai's story, the second chapter, "Mai-chan's Secret", and the third, "Mai-chan's Daily Life". Game Over was published on February 24, 2003 by Sanwa Shuppen, and serialized in Ayla Deluxe magazine.

A live-action film adaptation was released on November 29, 2014, directed and written by Sado Satō. An Koshi played the titular role of Mai-chan.

Plot
A young maid, referred to as "Mai-chan", happens to be immortal, and her mistress forces her to participate in sexual acts with customers, who are allowed to do whatever they want to her. As well as being immortal, she has the ability to regenerate, as does a young boy called Kizuna. A life of being sexually humiliated and dismembered daily ensues.

Characters
 Mai: The titular character. She is an innocent, clumsy, 17-year-old maid who is immortal, and has the power to regenerate.
 Kaede: Kaede is the chief maid of the mansion, and has a very sadistic personality. She enjoys the misfortune of Mai, who is sexually tortured every day. However, she does somewhat grow attached to Mai.
 Kizuna: He is a young boy who is a masochist, and in the same constitution as Mai. Like Mai, he also, has the power to regenerate.
 Sayurin: Kaede's "pet," a human with amputated limbs who appears to lack communication skills. She was also forced to be sexually tortured, but lacks immortality unlike Mai and is eventually accidentally killed.
 George Reitman: The "President of 'A' country", and one of the customers who came to the mansion. He threatens to take Mai away to be used as a lab experiment, but Kaede saves Mai from this worse fate by impaling him in the skull (Kaede does not want to lose Mai because she is one of her "pets").
 Erumo Muraki: One of the customers who came to the mansion. A tsundere.

Media

Chapters

Live action film
A live action film adaptation entitled MAI CHAN'S Daily Life: THE MOVIE was announced on Friday, 14 March 2014 by the manga creator Waita Uziga. Casting choices for the film included An Koshi as the titular character, Mai-chan, Miyako Akane as a new character named Miyako, Soaco Roman as the head maid, and Shogo Maruyama as the master of the residence. The film was directed and written by Sado Satō, and supervised by Waita Uziga. The film was released on November 29, 2014, and had an English release on September 20, 2016.

Reception
The manga is well known for its grotesque material, and two scenes nearing the manga's end have become a popular internet meme and subject on 4chan. The title was included on She's Lost Control's "A Beginner's Guide to Eff’d-Up Hentai", which also includes Night Shift Nurses, Bible Black, and Imouto Paradise!.

References

External links
 Author's Official website 
 

2003 manga
2004 manga
Horror anime and manga
Live-action films based on manga
Seinen manga
Japanese horror films